Adam Larsson (born 5 September 1999) is a Swedish professional footballer who plays as a forward for Ilves in the Veikkausliiga.

References

1999 births
Living people
Swedish footballers
FC Ilves players
Veikkausliiga players
Association football forwards